United Nations Security Council Resolution 69, adopted on March 4, 1949, having received and considered Israel’s application for membership in the United Nations, the Council decided that in its judgment Israel was a peace-loving state and recommended to the General Assembly that they grant membership to Israel.

The resolution was adopted by nine votes to one (Egypt), and one abstention from the United Kingdom. Those in favour were: China (ROC), France,  United States, Soviet Union, Argentina, Canada, Cuba, Norway, and Ukrainian SSR.

See also
List of United Nations Security Council Resolutions 1 to 100 (1946–1953)

References
Text of the Resolution at undocs.org

External links
 

 0069
Israeli–Palestinian conflict and the United Nations
 0069
 0069
1949 in Israel
March 1949 events